Willard Carl Kruger (1910–1984) was an American architect born in Sperry, Texas, who grew up in Raton, New Mexico.  He founded W. C. Kruger and Associates, which was an American architectural and engineering firm.  The firm designed a number of Los Alamos buildings, as part of the Manhattan Project.

Kruger graduated with an engineering degree from Oklahoma Agricultural and Mechanical College in 1934, then worked in New Mexico's State Planning division.  He served as New Mexico's "State Architect" from 1936 to 1937. Kruger headed the New Mexico state's group of architects within the Federal Emergency Relief Administration (FERA) New Deal agency, in Santa Fe.

He was several times later misidentified as "William C. Kruger".

Notable works
A number of works by Kruger or his firm are listed on the National Register of Historic Places, as noted.
Clayton High School and Junior High School (1935–41), Clayton, New Mexico, NRHP-listed
Carrie Tingley Hospital for Crippled Children (1937), Truth or Consequences, New Mexico, NRHP-listed
Clayton Public Library (1939), Clayton, New Mexico, NRHP-listed
Columbian School (1939), Raton, New Mexico, NRHP-listed
Longfellow School (1939), Raton, New Mexico, NRHP-listed
Raton Junior-Senior High School (1939), Raton, New Mexico, NRHP-listed
Las Vegas Municipal Building (1940), Las Vegas, New Mexico, NRHP-listed
Tierra Amarilla Air Force Station (1950–52), near Tierra Amarilla, New Mexico, NRHP-listed
New Mexico Bank & Trust Building (1961), Albuquerque, New Mexico
New Mexico State Capitol (1966), Santa Fe, New Mexico
University of New Mexico Humanities Building (1974), Albuquerque, New Mexico

Notes

References 

People from Raton, New Mexico
Architects from New Mexico
Architects from Texas
Oklahoma State University alumni
1910 births
1984 deaths
20th-century American architects
People from Grayson County, Texas